The Final Wave is the second live album released by Australian rock band Australian Crawl. It is a recording of the band's final Melbourne concert on 27 January 1986. The album reached #16 on the Australian album charts upon its release.

The album cover features a copy of Japanese artist Katsushika Hokusai's best known woodblock print, The Great Wave off Kanagawa. It was first published in 1832 (Edo period) and is Hokusai's most famous work. It depicts an enormous wave threatening boats near the Japanese prefecture of Kanagawa; Mount Fuji can be seen in the background. The wave is probably not intended to be a tsunami, but a normal ocean wave created by the wind.

Track listing
 "Beautiful People" (James Reyne, Mark Hudson) – 3:37
 "Unpublished Critics" (Reyne, Paul Williams) – 5:46
 "Lakeside" (Reyne) – 4:25
 "Love (Beats Me Up)" (Reyne) – 4:39
 "White Limbo" (Simon Binks)- 3:27
 "Two Can Play" (Simon Hussey, Reyne) – 2:35
 "Errol" (Guy McDonough, Reyne) – 3:18
 "Downhearted" (Sean Higgins, G McDonough, William 'Bill' McDonough) – 4:44
 "Daughters of the Northern Coast" (G McDonough, Reyne) – 3:31
 "The Boys Light Up" (Reyne) – 4:13
 "Indisposed" (Brad Robinson, James Robinson, James Reyne, W McDonough) – 3:04
 "Things Don't Seem" (G McDonough, Higgins) – 3:01
 "Reckless (Don't Be So)" (Reyne) – 5:14
 "(The Last) Louie Louie" (Richard Berry) – 5:17

Songwriting credits from Australasian Performing Right Association (APRA).

Personnel
Credits:
 Mark Greig - guitar, vocals 
 John Watson - drums 
 Simon Binks - guitar, vocals 
 Harry Brus - bass, vocals 
 Brad Robinson - guitars, keyboards 
 James Reyne - vocals

Charts

References

Australian Crawl albums
1986 live albums